Gersemia is a genus of soft corals in the family Nephtheidae. The type species is Gersemia loricata.

Characteristics
Colonies of Gersemia are arborescent, growing erectly with one main stem. The polyps are most numerous at the branch tips and are unable to retract into the calyces. The walls of the stalk and branches are stiffened with sclerites which are often brightly coloured. Corals in this genus do not contain zooxanthellae, the microalgae symbionts found in some other corals.

Species
The World Register of Marine Species includes the following species in the genus:

Gersemia antarctica (Kükenthal, 1902)
Gersemia carnea Verrill
Gersemia clavata (Danielssen, 1887)
Gersemia crassa (Danielssen, 1887)
Gersemia danielsseni (Studer, 1891)
Gersemia fruticosa Sars, 1860
Gersemia hicksoni (Gravier, 1913)
Gersemia japonica (Kükenthal, 1906)
Gersemia juliepackardae Williams & Lundsten, 2009
Gersemia lambi Williams, 2013
Gersemia liltvedi (Verseveldt & Williams, 1988)
Gersemia loricata von Marenzeller, 1878
Gersemia marenzelleri Kükenthal, 1906
Gersemia mirabilis (Danielssen, 1887)
Gersemia rubiformis (Ehrenberg, 1834)
Gersemia studeri Verrill
Gersemia uvaeformis (May, 1900)

References

Nephtheidae
Octocorallia genera